Maredsous may refer to:
Maredsous (hamlet)
Maredsous Abbey, a Benedictine monastery at Denée near Namur in Belgium
Maredsous cheese, a cheese originated and still produced at Maredsous Abbey (above)
Maredsous beer, an abbey beer brewed by Duvel Moortgat Brewery in Belgium